The Shinnecock Canal (also known as the Shinnecock and Peconic Canal) is a canal that cuts across the South Fork at Hampton Bays, New York. The canal opened to traffic in 1892.

History
The original Shinnecock Canal was dug in 1892. This did not alleviate the difference in elevation between the canal's two ends but sought to mitigate it. Another effect of this as found in the records of the New York State Salt Water Bays Commission was the water level of Shinnecock Bay was raised by one foot.

The lowest bridge is the fixed railroad bridge, with a height of  vertical clearance above the water.

The lock system now is the only navigation lock operating on Long Island.  The lock increased the salinity levels in Shinnecock Bay which had nearly assumed fresh water proportions and was resulting in a dying off of its shellfish population even though it was separated from the Atlantic by a narrow barrier island. Shinnecock Bay's salinity levels were solidified during Great Hurricane of 1938 which broke through the barrier island to form Shinnecock Inlet almost due south of the canal.  The new inlet has created a shortcut to the Atlantic that is now used by 27,000 boats per year.

The name Canoe Place comes from the Indian word "Niamuck", which described a canoe portage between the two bays.  This portage indicates that there was no viable water connection between them.  There is no evidence that the Montauketts or Shinnecocks dug a canal, together or separately.

References

External links 
 Newsday profile
 Rochester history of New York canals

Southampton (town), New York
Canals in New York (state)
Canals opened in 1892